Jonker is a Dutch surname. It is also a variation of the title jonkheer. The name can be occupational of origin, indicating an ancestor who was or worked for a jonkheer, or toponymical, e.g. referring to a house named De Jonker.  People with the surname include:

Andries Jonker (born 1962), Dutch football player and manager
Charles Jonker (1933–1991), South African racing cyclist
Christiaan Jonker (born 1986), South African cricketer
Henk Jonker (1912–2002), Dutch photographer
Ingrid Jonker (1933-1965), South African poet
Ingrid Jonker Prize, literary prize for the best Afrikaans or English poetry debut work
Ingrid Jonker (film), Dutch English-language film about her life
Jacobus Jonker (fl. 1996), South African paralympic athlete
Johannes Jonker (born 1994), South African rugby player
JW Jonker (born 1987), South African rugby player
Kees Jonker (1909–1987), Dutch competitive sailor
Kelly Jonker (born 1990), Dutch field hockey player
Kobus Jonker (fl. 2000), South African paralympic athlete
Kobus "Donker" Jonker, former head of the South African Police Service Occult Related Crimes Unit and a figure in the Satanic panic (South Africa)
Louis Jonker (1962), South African biblical scholar and linguist
Margo Jonker (born 1954), American softball coach
Marius Jonker (born 1968), South African rugby referee
Patrick Jonker (born 1969), Dutch-born Australian racing cyclist
Patrick Jonker Veloway, Australian bikeway named for him
Robert James Jonker (born 1960), American (Michigan) judge
Patrick Jonker (born 1944), Australian racing cyclist
 (born 1980), Dutch jazz singer
Sjouke Jonker (1924–2007), Dutch journalist and politician, MEP 1979–84
Jonkers
Jan Jonkers (born 1955), Dutch racing cyclist
 (1890–1971), Dutch jurist and university dean
Marayke Jonkers (born 1981), Australian swimmer and paratriathlete
Tim Jonkers (born 1980), Dutch-born Irish rugby player
Adopted as a given name
Jonker Afrikaner (c.1785–1861), Namibian Orlam leader
Jan Jonker Afrikaner (c.1820–1861), Namibian Orlam leader, son of Jonker
Jan Jonker Afrikaner High School, secondary school in Windhoek, Namibia

See also
The Jonker, 726 carats diamond found by Johannes Jacobus Jonker in 1934
Jonker Sailplanes, South Africa glider manufacturer founded by Uys and Attie Jonker
Jonker JS-1 Revelation, one of its gliders
Jonker Walk and Jonker Street, Malacca street names dating from the Dutch colonial time (1641–1825)
Théo De Joncker (1894–1964), Belgian composer
Yonkers, New York, named after Jonker Adriaen van der Donck (1618–1655)

References

Dutch-language surnames
Afrikaans-language surnames
Surnames of Dutch origin
Occupational surnames